The 2020 ASUN women's basketball tournament was the 34th edition of the ASUN Conference championship. It took place March 7, 11, and 15 in several arenas at campus sites. The winner would have received the league's automatic bid to the 2020 NCAA tournament.

Format
The ASUN Championship is a three-day single-elimination tournament. Eight teams will compete in the championship, with the higher seeded team in each matchup hosting the game.

Seeds

Schedule

Bracket

* denotes overtime

See also
 2020 Atlantic Sun men's basketball tournament

References

External links 
Championship Details

Tournament
ASUN women's basketball tournament
Atlantic Sun women's basketball tournament